Home and Away: Weddings is an exclusive-to-DVD special of Australia's most popular soap Home and Away.  It was released on 1 March 2006 and is a continuation to its previous DVD Home and Away: Romances, which is in a similar style.  It takes a lookback at all the classic Home and Away weddings from it 18 years from between 1988 and 2006 and it is hosted by Home and Away star Kate Ritchie and contains every Summer Bay wedding in a movie length presentation.  Also included is 2 full episodes from Leah and Vinnie's wedding.

Weddings

Interviews
 Kimberley Cooper - Gypsy Nash
 Ada Nicodemou - Leah Patterson
 Kip Gamblin - Scott Hunter
 Jason Smith - Robbie Hunter
 Tim Campbell - Dan Baker

Trivia
Throughout Weddings, facts about Home and Away appear on screen:

 Just weeks after her wedding, Bobby found out Morag and Don were her real parents.
 Nearly all the Home and Away wedding dresses have been kept for posterity.
 Four identical copies were made of Sally's dress to allow for stunt scenes.
 The bridesmaids' dresses were designed by Melissa Kritsotakis.

DVD

See also
 Home and Away
 Home and Away: Secrets and the City
 Home and Away: Hearts Divided
 Home and Away: Romances

References

External links
 Home and Away:Weddings at the Internet Movie Database

Australian television soap operas
Seven Network original programming